The First Battle of Taku Forts was the first attack of the Anglo-French alliance against the Taku Forts along the Hai River in Tianjin, China, on 20 May 1858, during the Second Opium War.

The British and French sent a squadron of gunboats, under Rear-Admiral Admiral Michael Seymour, to attack China's Taku Forts. The battle ended as an allied success. However, the first phase of the Second Opium War would end with the Treaties of Tianjin and the forts were returned to the hands of the Qing Army, leading to the Second Battle of Taku Forts in 1859.

Background 
After the beginning of the Second Opium War, the Anglo-French alliance captured the significant harbor of Canton (Guangzhou) during the Battle of Canton in 1857. The Xianfeng Emperor received the news that Canton had been occupied on 27 January 1858. The British commander Michael Seymour, hoping to force a settlement (the later Treaty of Tianjin), ordered an attack on the Taku Forts as they were the closer path towards Peking.

Notes

References 

Bartlett, Beatrice S. Monarchs and Ministers: The Grand Council in Mid-Ch'ing China, 1723–1820. Berkeley and Los Angeles: University of California Press, 1991.
Ebrey, Patricia. Chinese Civilization: A Sourcebook. New York: Simon and Schuster, 1993.
Elliott, Mark C. "The Limits of Tartary: Manchuria in Imperial and National Geographies." Journal of Asian Studies 59 (2000): 603-46.
Faure, David. Emperor and Ancestor: State and Lineage in South China. 2007.

External links 

 Taku Forts 1860

Battles of the Second Opium War
Naval battles of the Opium Wars
May 1858 events
Conflicts in 1858
1858 in China